Josef Straka or Joseph Straka may refer to 
Josef Straka (rower, born 1904), Sr. (1904–1976), Olympic rower from Czechoslovakia 
Josef Straka (rower, born 1948), Jr. (born 1948), Olympic rower from Czechoslovakia
Josef Straka (ice hockey) (born 1978), Czech ice hockey player
Sepp Straka (Josef Straka, born 1993), Olympic golfer from Austria